The list of Southern Conference football champions includes 20 distinct teams that have won the college football championship awarded by the Southern Conference since its creation. In total, forty-one teams have sponsored football in the conference. Just two —Mercer and Western Carolina—have never won a Southern Conference football championship.

The conference was formed in 1921 when fourteen members from the Southern Intercollegiate Athletic Association (SIAA) met in Atlanta, Georgia with the purpose of creating a workable number of conference games for each member. The Southern Conference is notable for having spawned two other major conferences. In 1933, thirteen schools located south and west of the Appalachians (Alabama, Auburn, Florida, Georgia, Georgia Tech, Kentucky, LSU, Mississippi, Mississippi State, Sewanee, Tennessee, Tulane, and Vanderbilt) departed to form the Southeastern Conference. Twenty years later, in 1953, seven schools (Clemson, Duke, Maryland, North Carolina, North Carolina State, South Carolina, and Wake Forest) withdrew to form the Atlantic Coast Conference.

Currently the conference competes at the National Collegiate Athletic Association (NCAA) Division I level in athletics, with the football teams playing in the Football Championship Subdivision (FCS). There are nine football playing members of the Southern Conference:Chattanooga, The Citadel, East Tennessee State, Furman, Mercer, Samford, Virginia Military Institute, Western Carolina, and Wofford. Southern Conference teams have been successful in the NCAA Division I FCS Playoffs, leading all conferences with an 87–49 (.640) record. Current and former Southern Conference teams have won a total of 12 national championships.

Champions by year

Undefeated teams claiming championships: 1922–1932
The Southern Conference does not officially recognize championships claimed from the 1922–32 seasons, as there were upwards of 20 to 23 teams competing within the conference during this time. However, some championships are still cited and claimed by the individual schools.

Champions: 1933–present
In 1978 Division I football was split into two classifications: the Football Bowl Subdivision (formerly I-A) and Football Championship Subdivision (formerly I-AA). The Southern Conference moved to the FCS in 1982 where its members compete for the NCAA Division I Football Championship.

Championships by team

Current members

Former members

References

Southern Conference
Champions